Computer software is said to have Internal Documentation if the notes on how and why various parts of code operate is included within the source code as comments.  It is often combined with meaningful variable names with the intention of providing potential future programmers a means of understanding the workings of the code.

This contrasts with external documentation, where programmers keep their notes and explanations in a separate document.

Internal documentation has become increasingly popular as it cannot be lost, and any programmer working on the code is immediately made aware of its existence and has it readily available.

Technical communication